Suzy's World was a New Zealand educational children's television programme presented by Suzy Cato which ran from September 1999 to September 2002 aimed at children aged 5–9. It provided scientific information (e.g. electrical circuits) in a way that young children could relate to.

References

External links 
 

1990s New Zealand television series
2000s New Zealand television series
1999 New Zealand television series debuts
2002 New Zealand television series endings
Children's education television series
New Zealand children's television series
Television shows funded by NZ on Air
Three (TV channel) original programming